Taurida fulvomaculata is a species of acoel. It is the only species in the monotypic genus Taurida and the monotypic family Taurididae.

References

Acoelomorphs
Animals described in 1959